Pristimantis pataikos is a species of frog in the family Strabomantidae. It is known from two locations, one in the Amazonas Region in northern Peru and the other one in nearby Zamora-Chinchipe Province in southern Ecuador.
Its natural habitat is tropical moist montane forest at elevations of  asl. It is threatened by habitat loss. The location in Ecuador is within the Podocarpus National Park.

References

pataikos
Amphibians of the Andes
Amphibians of Ecuador
Amphibians of Peru
Amphibians described in 1999
Taxonomy articles created by Polbot